César Rosario Morales Durán (born October 5, 1986) is a Mexican former professional footballer who last played for Club Xelajú MC.

References

External links
 

1986 births
Living people
Mexican footballers
Association football midfielders
Dorados de Sinaloa footballers
Correcaminos UAT footballers
Altamira F.C. players
C.F. Mérida footballers
Ulisses FC players
Antigua GFC players
Xelajú MC players
Comunicaciones F.C. players
Liga MX players
Ascenso MX players
Liga Premier de México players
Armenian Premier League players
Liga Nacional de Fútbol de Guatemala players
Mexican expatriate footballers
Expatriate footballers in Armenia
Expatriate footballers in Guatemala
Mexican expatriate sportspeople in Armenia
Mexican expatriate sportspeople in Guatemala
Footballers from Sinaloa
People from Guasave